Bangladesh Petroleum Corporation (BPC) is a government agency in Bangladesh to import, distribute and market oil and petroleum products. A. B. M. Azad is the chairperson of Bangladesh Petroleum Corporation.

History 
Founded in 1976 by Presidential Ordinance to import and distribute crude oil, fuel, lubricating oil, and petroleum products in Bangladesh. It is managed by the Ministry of Power, Energy and Mineral Resources.

Bangladesh Petroleum Corporation had an annual import level of as much as 29 million barrels as of 2009.

The 2017 Economic Survey found Bangladesh Petroleum Corporation to be the most profitable state-owned enterprises. It made more than 90 billion taka in the 2015-16 fiscal year. Bangladesh Petroleum Corporation decided not to sell oil to Biman Bangladesh, the state owned airlines, on credit for because the airlines outstanding due had crossed 16 billion taka in December 2017.

On 20 February 2018, Bangladesh Petroleum Corporation sought permission from the government to set the oil prices using a new formula that will automatically adjust the prices with the price on the international market. The company feared the low price on domestic market might lead to losses for the company and encourage the smuggling of oil in the border areas with India.

In 2020, the Government of Bangladesh changed the law to require state owned enterprises to deposit surplus or idle funds to the national treasury. Bangladesh Petroleum Corporation deposited 50 billion taka to the national treasury. Bangladesh Petroleum Corporation decided to use private oil tanks to store oil as its own tanks were near full capacity in 2020. This was the result of a 60 percent decline in sales following the lockdown during the COVID-19 pandemic in Bangladesh.

Companies 
 Eastern Refinery Limited
 Padma Oil Company Limited
 Jamuna Oil Company Limited
 Meghna Oil Company Limited
 Eastern Lubricants Blenders Limited
 Standard Asiatic Oil Company Limited
 LP Gas Limited
 Asphaltic Bitumen Plant

References

External links

 Bangladesh Petroleum Corporation official website
 Eastern Refinery official site
 Bangladesh Petroleum Corporation, BusinessWeek report on BPC.

Oil and gas companies of Bangladesh
1976 establishments in Bangladesh